Richard Adrián Salinas Benítez (born 6 February 1988, in Asunción) is a Paraguayan footballer who plays as a defender for Sportivo Iteño in the Paraguayan División Intermedia.

Career
Salinas was signed on 10 March 2008 but officially registered in August by Sport do Recife.

International career 
He capped for Paraguay U20 at 2007 South American Youth Championship.

References

External links
 
 

1988 births
Living people
Sportspeople from Asunción
Paraguayan footballers
Paraguay international footballers
Paraguayan expatriate footballers
12 de Octubre Football Club players
Sport Club do Recife players
Volta Redonda FC players
Club Atlético 3 de Febrero players
Independiente F.B.C. footballers
Sociedade Esportiva e Recreativa Caxias do Sul players
Club Olimpia footballers
Sport Huancayo footballers
River Plate (Asunción) footballers
Campeonato Brasileiro Série C players
Paraguayan Primera División players
Peruvian Primera División players
Association football defenders
Paraguayan expatriate sportspeople in Brazil
Paraguayan expatriate sportspeople in Peru
Expatriate footballers in Brazil
Expatriate footballers in Peru